Apacer Technology Inc. is a Taiwanese multinational corporation that designs and markets consumer electronics, memory modules and digital storage hardware and software. Founded in 1997 as a DRAM module supplier, in 1999, Apacer Technology expanded its product range to include mobile storage covering flash and USB products. In 2002 Apacer Technology founded its firmware R&D team to reposition the enterprise as a digital storage application creator.

History 
Apacer was the first company in the world to introduce several products or unique features of some existing products:
 In 2006 introduced world's first 2.5" SATA RAID Flash Drive (SRFD) that increases data reliability and security; 
 In 2008 introduces SSD+ Optimizer, the world's first Solid State Drive (SSD) optimization solution with HyperFast technology from innovator Diskeeper Corporation
 In 2010 Apacer introduces the world’s first four dual SSD solutions – CSFD, SRFD, SHFD and SUFD, adding additional functions to the SSD
 In 2015 Apacer introduces the world's first dual interface SSD AS720

Products

Industrial products including SSDs and DRAM
Consumer products including Memory Card, USB Flash Drive, Portable Hard Drive, SSD, Power Bank, Cable & Adapter, Hub and Card Reader

Offices 
Apacer Technology Inc.’s headquarters is in Taiwan, with offices in Mainland China, United States, Europe, Japan and India.

Apacer has also 5 regional locations: Fremont, California for the United States, Eindhoven office in the Netherlands serving the EMEA area, Shanghai for China, Tokyo for Japan and the Bangalore office serving India.

In November 2010, Apacer joined hands with the Bangladesh Computer Society (BCS) to start distributing its products directly to the Bangladeshi Market.

See also
 List of companies of Taiwan

References

Softpedia
Embedded Computer Design
PC World
Mobile Magazine

External links

Apacer Official Website

Taiwanese companies established in 1997
Electronics companies of Taiwan
Electronics companies established in 1997
Companies based in New Taipei
Computer storage companies
Portable audio player manufacturers
Taiwanese brands
Computer memory companies